The 1970 Newark mayoral election was held on June 16, 1970. Incumbent mayor Hugh Addonizio ran for a third term in office but was defeated by civil engineer Kenneth A. Gibson. Gibson became the first black man elected mayor of a major city in the Northeastern United States or Eastern Seaboard. and remained in office until 1986.

Gibson finished first in a primary election on May 12 but did not receive a majority of the vote. He defeated Addonizio in the run-off with 55.88% of the vote and record turnout.

Background

Race
By 1970, Newark was one of the United States' first majority-black cities. However, city government, the police department, and political representation at the state and federal level were still overwhelmingly white, possibly due in part to the black population skewing below the voting age.

1967 riots

In the summer of 1967, Newark was the site of race riots, one of 159 throughout the country that summer. Beginning with the arrest, beating, and jailing of a black taxicab driver by two white police officers, the city descended into violent chaos for six days. From July 12 to 17, violence in the city left a total of 16 civilian bystanders, 8 criminal suspects, a police officer, and a firefighter dead; 353 civilians, 214 suspects, 67 police officers, 55 firefighters, and 38 military personnel injured; and 689 civilians and 811 suspects arrested. Property damage is estimated to have exceeded $10 million.

Addonizio corruption investigation
In December 1969, stemming from federal investigations into the cause and handling of the riots, Mayor Addonizio and nine current or former municipal officials were indicted by a federal grand jury on charges of extortion and tax evasion. Five other persons were also indicted, including reputed mafioso Anthony Boiardo.

Primary election

Candidates
 Hugh Addonizio, incumbent Mayor since 1962
 John P. Caufield, former Newark Fire Director (1962–70)
 Kenneth A. Gibson, civil engineer and candidate for mayor in 1966
 Anthony Imperiale, City Councilman and vigilante leader during 1967 riots
 Alexander Matturri, State Senator
 George C. Richardson, former State Assemblyman
 Harry Wheeler

Endorsements

Results

Runoff

Endorsements

Results

Aftermath

Addonizio

Addonizio was convicted of conspiracy and 63 counts of extortion in July and sentenced to ten years in federal prison in September.

Caufield

John Caufield was elected to the New Jersey Senate as a Democrat in 1978 and served until his death in 1986.

Gibson

Gibson went on to serve four terms as mayor until he was defeated for re-election by Sharpe James in 1986. While mayor, he ran twice for Governor of New Jersey in 1981 and 1985, but failed to win the Democratic nomination. He returned to politics in 1998, when he narrowly lost a race for Essex County Executive to Republican James Treffinger. In 2002, he pleaded guilty to tax evasion.

Imperiale

Imperiale represented the East Ward as an independent member of the state legislature from 1972 to 1978. He opposed Gibson in the 1974 mayoral election. He served one more term in the Assembly as a Republican from 1980 to 1982 but left office to run for Governor in the 1981 election. He finished sixth in the Republican primary.

References

June 1970 events in the United States
1970
1970 United States mayoral elections
Newark